Scottdale Armory is a historic National Guard armory located at Scottdale, Westmoreland County, Pennsylvania.  It was built in 1929, and is a one-story, rectangular brick building executed in the Art Deco style. The administrative area is located on the basement level, with the drill hall on the first floor.  A one-story brick annex was added about 1950.

It was designed by architect Joseph F. Kuntz.

It was added to the National Register of Historic Places in 1991.

References

Armories on the National Register of Historic Places in Pennsylvania
Art Deco architecture in Pennsylvania
Infrastructure completed in 1929
Buildings and structures in Westmoreland County, Pennsylvania
National Register of Historic Places in Westmoreland County, Pennsylvania
1929 establishments in Pennsylvania